Levi Leslie Lamborn (October 10, 1829 – June 14, 1910) was an Ohio doctor, horticulturalist, and politician.

Born in 1829 in Chester County, Pennsylvania, Lamborn was the son of Townsend Lamborn and Anna (Clayton) Lamborn. Townsend Lamborn was involved in local politics and once ran for governor as the nominee of the Anti-Masonic party. The Lamborns were a Quaker family, and Levi was educated in schools of that sect. The family moved to Ohio when Lamborn was a boy and settled in Salem, Ohio. Lamborn decided at the age of fifteen to pursue a career in medicine. After studying under a local doctor, he moved to Philadelphia for additional training, then returned to Ohio to attend lectures at Western Reserve College (now Case Western Reserve University) in Cleveland.

After graduating in 1849, Lamborn moved to Alliance, Ohio, and set up a medical practice. That same year, he married Maria Grant. They would have six children, all of whom were given the initials L.L.L. In 1854, he founded the Alliance Ledger, the town's first newspaper, but sold it a few months later. Lamborn became involved in local politics, running for a seat in the Ohio House of Representatives as a Free Soil candidate in 1858.  He was unsuccessful, but was appointed the clerk of the house from 1859 to 1861. In 1866, he retired from the practice of medicine, but remained active in politics. In 1874, Lamborn ran for a state senate seat, this time as a Democrat. He was not elected, but ran again in 1876, this time for the United States House seat for Ohio's 17th congressional district. Lamborn's opponent in 1876 was his friend William McKinley, the future president, who defeated Lamborn by some 3300 votes.

In 1874, Lamborn founded a bank with several associates.  He also became a trustee of the State Asylum for the Deaf and Dumb. Although he no longer ran for office after 1876, Lamborn remained a popular speaker on behalf of Democratic candidates in the area. Lamborn was a serious student of horticulture, specifically dealing with breeding carnations. He grew some of the first carnations in the United States in 1866. Before a debate in his 1876 race against McKinley, he gave his opponent a red carnation; after McKinley won, he adopted the flower as a good-luck token for the rest of his career in politics, keeping a vase of them in the White House. In 1892, Lamborn published a book on the subject, "American Carnation Culture".

References

Sources
 
 
 
 
 

1829 births
1910 deaths
People from Chester County, Pennsylvania
People from Alliance, Ohio
Writers from Ohio
Writers from Pennsylvania
People from Salem, Ohio